Klepper is an American television docuseries hosted by Jordan Klepper.  It is his second series for Comedy Central following the end of The Opposition with Jordan Klepper in 2018.  Klepper premiered on May 9, 2019.

Premise
Klepper follows Jordan Klepper operating outside of the studio in the field. He travels across the United States and shares conversations with real people.

Production
On June 15, 2018, Comedy Central announced that it was canceling The Opposition with Jordan Klepper after one season, but that Klepper would be hosting a new primetime weekly talk show. Klepper would be stepping away from the traditional late-night desk and out exploring various communities in the United States to learn about various issues that are impacting the country. Each episode will be accompanied by a filmed podcast in which Klepper and the series producers discuss behind the scenes, and how their perspectives have changed as a result.

During filming of the series, Klepper was arrested during a Board of Regents meeting at the Georgia State Capitol at a protest about undocumented students. Shortly after he was released on bail, Klepper released the following statement on his social media, "Yesterday I learned many things. Police cars are not built for lanky giraffe bodies was one. Another, there are good people fighting good fights across this land. In Georgia they are denying college admission and tuition benefits to undocumented students. These are students who pay taxes, grew up here and want to learn and give back to their community. We need more thoughtful, curious, educated young adults dedicated to making this place better. Education is a human right. Places like Freedom University are fighting the good fight. I was honored to stand with them and the other community faith leaders, teachers and protestors. Education not segregation. Sounds like a smart idea. If you think so, let the Georgia Board of Regents know."

Episodes

See also
 The Opposition with Jordan Klepper

References

External links 
 
 

2010s American political television series
2019 American television series debuts
Comedy Central original programming
English-language television shows